Rz or RZ can stand for:

People:
 Friederike Schwarz, Czech composer and journalist who used rz as a pseudonym)
 Robin Zander, American rock singer with Cheap Trick
 Richard Zednik, Slovak professional hockey player
 Roger Zelazny, American science fiction and fantasy writer
 Renée Zellweger, American actress
 Robert Zemeckis, American filmmaker
 Ron Ziegler, White House Press Secretary under Richard Nixon
 Raquel Zimmermann, Brazilian model
 Robert Zimmerman (disambiguation)
 Rachel Zoe, American fashion stylist
 Rob Zombie, an American heavy metal artist and film director

Other uses:
 Rz (digraph), a digraph of the Polish alphabet
 ASEA Rz, a Swedish test locomotive
 Redneck Zombies, a 1986 horror film
 Return-to-zero, in line coding
 Revolutionary Cells (RZ), a militant leftist organisation active in West Germany between 1973 and 1995